Wills is a surname. Notable people with the surname include:
 Alec Wills (1911–1941), English cricketer and Royal Air Force officer
 Alfred Wills (1828–1912), English High Court judge and mountaineer
 Andrew Wills (b. 1972), Australian football player
 Anneke Wills (b. 1941), British actress
 Arthur Wills (musician) (1926–2020), English musician, composer and professor
 Arthur Walters Wills (1868–1948), English politician, MP for North Dorset
 Bob Wills (1905–1975), American Western swing musician
 Bump Wills (b. 1952), American baseball player
 Childe Wills (1878–1940), early associate of Henry Ford, and contributor to the design of the Model T
 Chill Wills (1902–1978), American actor and singer
 Chris Wills (b. 1978), British gameshow Countdown champion
 Christopher Wills, American biologist
 David Wills (disambiguation)
 Edwina Florence Wills (1915–2002), American composer and sculptor
 Ernest C. Wills, American college baseball coach
 Frank Wills (architect) (1822–1857), British architect
 Frank Wills (baseball) (1958–2012), American baseball player
 Frank Wills (security guard) (1948–2000), security guard that discovered the break-in that led to the Watergate scandal
 Frederick Wills (disambiguation)
 Garry Wills (b. 1934), American author and historian
 George Alfred Wills (1854–1928), President of Imperial Tobacco
 Harry Wills (1889–1958), American boxer
 Helen Wills Moody (1905–1998), American tennis player
 Henry Wills (disambiguation)
 Horatio Wills (1811–1861),  Australian pastoralist and politician, father of Tom
 James Wills (disambiguation)
 Jedrick Wills (born 1999), American football player
 John Wills (disambiguation)
 Jonathan Wills (journalist), British journalist
 Jonathan W. G. Wills, Scottish journalist
 Josh Wills, member of the American band Story of the Year
 Kevin Wills (b. 1980), English footballer
 Lucy Wills (1888–1964), English haematologist
 Marcus Wills (b. 1972), Australian artist
 Mark Wills (b. 1973), American country music artist
 Mary Wills (1914–1997), American film costume designer
 Maury Wills (1932–2022), American baseball player
 Michael Wills (b. 1952), English politician
 Nat M. Wills (1873–1917), American vaudeville entertainer and recording artist
 Richard Wills (politician) (born 1945), American politician
 Richard J. Wills Jr (born 1942), bishop of the United Methodist Church
 Rick Wills (born 1947), British rock musician
 Robbie Wills (b. 1968) American politician from Arkansas
 Robert Wills, Church of Ireland Archdeacon of Cloyne, 1889–1919
 Royal Barry Wills (1895–1962), American architect
 Simon Wills (racing driver) (b. 1976), New Zealand racing driver
 Sue Wills (1944–2022), Australian academic and activist
 Ted Wills (b. 1934), American baseball player
 Tom Wills (1835–1880), Australian sportsman
 Thomas Wills (disambiguation)
 William Wills (disambiguation)
 Wills (baseball), American baseball player

See also
 Wills (disambiguation)
 Wiles (disambiguation)
 Wilis (disambiguation)
 Willes (surname)
 Willis (disambiguation)

English-language surnames
Surnames from given names